The 23rd CARIFTA Games was held in Bridgetown, Barbados, on April 2–4, 1994.

Participation (unofficial)

Detailed result lists can be found on the "World Junior Athletics History" website.  An unofficial count yields the number of about 265 athletes (153 junior (under-20) and 112 youth (under-17)) from about 17 countries:  Antigua and Barbuda (2), Bahamas (30), Barbados (44), Bermuda (12), British Virgin Islands (3), Cayman Islands (3), Dominica (2), French Guiana (6), Grenada (10), Guadeloupe (21), Guyana (9), Jamaica (60), Martinique (15), Saint Kitts and Nevis (9), Saint Lucia (3), Saint Vincent and the Grenadines (1), Trinidad and Tobago (35).

Austin Sealy Award

The Austin Sealy Trophy for the most outstanding athlete of the games was awarded to Obadele Thompson from Barbados.  He won 2 gold medals (100m, and 200m) in the junior
(U-20) category setting new games records.

Medal summary
Medal winners are published by category: Boys under 20 (Junior), Girls under 20 (Junior), Boys under 17 (Youth), and Girls under 17 (Youth).
Complete results can be found on the "World Junior Athletics History"
website.

Boys under 20 (Junior)

Girls under 20 (Junior)

Boys under 17 (Youth)

Girls under 17 (Youth)

Medal table (unofficial)

References

External links
World Junior Athletics History

CARIFTA Games
International athletics competitions hosted by Barbados
1994 in Barbadian sport
CARIFTA
1994 in Caribbean sport